Special Operations Response Teams are a group under the US Federal Bureau of Prisons, or BOP for short, a component of the US Department of Justice (DOJ). The BOP is responsible for maintaining the custody of anyone convicted of committing a federal crime. To achieve this goal, the BOP maintains a number of correctional facilities, which are divided into six regions, throughout the US. These facilities house approximately 211,195 inmates of varying security levels. Facilities are designated as either minimum, medium, maximum, or the most recent addition, super max.

To help maintain security within facilities under its control, the BOP has formed a number of specialized tactical, and emergency response units. Operating under the direct control of the BOPs Office of Emergency Preparedness, these units consist of Special Operations Response Teams, or SORTs; Disturbance Control Teams; and Hostage Negotiation Teams. The Office of Emergency Preparedness was established in May 1990 and is responsible for overseeing the agency's SORT program and coordinating emergency response capabilities. It also acts as a liaison office with other agencies during crisis situations. SORTs are highly trained tactical units capable of responding to prison disturbances and providing assistance to other law enforcement agencies during emergencies.

Foundation
The first SORT was formed in 1982 at the United States Penitentiary (USP) Leavenworth, Kansas. The team was formed as a response to the increasing level of violence being encountered in facility. A second team came on line shortly afterward at the USP Marion, Illinois. Currently all federal correctional complexes and higher level security facilities are required to maintain a SORT.

Scenarios
Possible scenarios that may require the deployment of a SORT are:

Riots
Attack on staff or inmates
Escapes or attempted escapes
Hostage situations
Any terrorist or military strike on the United States

Personnel
SORT members (Operators) are selected based on a vigorously physical and mental process. All operators are selected from the host facility's staff. Each SORT member has a regular duty assignment and is assigned to the SORT on a collateral basis. SORTs will primarily operate at their host facility but are on call to respond to any incident that may occur at any BOP or federal controlled facility. The leader of a SORT team can be of any rank,
SORT teams are composed of 15+ personnel from various departments within the institution. Each team will have a number of specialist personnel assigned to it, such as:

An EMT
A certified firearms instructor
A rappel master
A security specialist/locksmith
A blueprint expert
A sniper/spotter team
A forced entry specialist trained in the use of explosives
A chemical agents specialist

Training
SORTs receive their initial training, and certification from the Office of Emergency Management, and are required to train for at least 8 hours a month. Most facilities dedicate at least 16 hours to training, with many more hours of personnel time spent honing skills. Monthly training includes firearms instruction, tactical planning, emergency medical care, rappelling, physical training, riot control techniques and other skills as deemed necessary. To maintain their certification teams participate in an annual regional training exercise. The teams are evaluated and ranked using national standards developed by the Office Of Emergency Preparedness. Teams found to be lacking any particular areas are given remedial training and brought up to standard. Teams are required to hold at least two mock emergency exercise per year to test their response to any potential crisis situation that may arise.

All SORT members and other emergency BOP staff are equipped with work phones. If a situation develops that requires the use of the SORT, the team would be paged, and would respond to the facility. In the event a large scale emergency should arise, the BOP maintains palletized trailers of equipment at several storage areas around the country. BOP also maintains agreements with the Department of Defense (DOD) to have BOP personnel, and equipment transported on DOD aircraft.

History
BOP SORTs have participated in several high-profile events over the last few years. In 1991, Cuban inmates at Federal Correctional Institution (FCI) Talladega, Alabama rioted and took several hostages. The BOP responded immediately by deploying several SORTs, and received additional assistance from the FBI's Hostage Rescue Team (HRT), along with several regional FBI SWAT teams. As the situation grew more tense, the order was given to storm the facility. The assault was initiated by the HRT, and the federal tactical units were successful in regaining control of the facility.

Some of the lesser known operations that BOP SORTs have been involved in include the mass movement of inmates from FCI Miami, after the facility was damaged by Hurricane Andrew; and the resolution of inmate disturbances at FCI Oakdale, Louisiana, FCI Lawton, Oklahoma, and the USP Atlanta.

In 1992 the first Rodney King beating trial came to a close. The officers charged with using excessive force to arrest Rodney king were found not guilty. The city erupted in a spasm of violence. The city of Los Angeles was unable to cope with the rising level of anarchy in its streets, and requested assistance from both the state and federal governments. The US government immediately ordered the deployment of federal troops and law enforcement agencies to the embattled city. The BOP dispatched several of its SORTs to the area who helped maintain control of federal facilities in the area.

In 2020,  SORT teams deployed to American cities, including Washington, D.C. as a part of the response to the George Floyd protests in Washington, D.C. and Miami, during the June 2020 unrest that followed after the murder of George Floyd. The SORTs in question did not wear identifying clothing or respond to questions about their affiliation. This led to some politicians and journalists decrying the use of unidentifiable federal law enforcement officers due to a lack of accountability. The SORTs were described by some as an "American secret police." Then attorney general William Barr defended their use.

On June 18, 2020 the Office of Inspector General issued its report on two incidents at BOP facilities involving SORT members during training exercises. During one mock exercise, the SORT deployed a "flash bang" grenade, a non-lethal munition intended to disorient enemies, when it exploded on a staff member causing significant injuries requiring surgery and ongoing treatment.

Uniform and equipment
Uniforms consist of US Battle Dress uniforms, Kevlar helmets, and tactical foot wear. SORT equipment varies from team to team, with all teams being equipped with level IIIA body armor, and some type of load bearing vest. Additional protection is provided by the use of Body Bunker ballistic shields.

SORT weapons include SIG Sauer P228 or Glock 19 pistols, Colt 9mm SMGs or HK MP5 SMGs, Benelli M1 Super 90 shotguns, McMillan M86 SR Sniper rifles, 37mm gas guns, diversionary devices, and chemical munitions.

References

Imprisonment and detention in the United States
Law enforcement titles
Federal Bureau of Prisons
1982 establishments in the United States